Columns of San Marco and San Teodoro are two columns in Piazza San Marco, Venice, Italy. They comprise the Column of the Lion and the Column of San Todaro. The sculpture Lion of Venice surmounts Column of the Lion.

Gallery

Monuments and memorials in Venice
Monumental columns in Italy
Piazza San Marco
Sculptures of lions
Sculptures of saints
Victory monuments